Leslie Milne may refer to:

 Leslie Milne (field hockey) (born 1956), former field hockey player from the United States
 Mrs. Leslie Milne (1860–1932), English anthropologist